Willy Hufschmid (born 9 October 1918) was a Swiss field handball player who competed in the 1936 Summer Olympics. He was part of the Swiss field handball team that won the bronze medal. He played three matches.

References

Willy Hufschmid's profile at databaseOlympics
Willy Hufschmid's profile at Sports Reference.com

External links
 

1918 births
Possibly living people
Field handball players at the 1936 Summer Olympics
Olympic bronze medalists for Switzerland
Olympic handball players of Switzerland
Swiss male handball players
Olympic medalists in handball
Medalists at the 1936 Summer Olympics